LSH is a cryptographic hash function designed in 2014 by South Korea to provide integrity in general-purpose software environments such as PCs and smart devices. LSH is one of the cryptographic algorithms approved by the Korean Cryptographic Module Validation Program (KCMVP).
And it is the national standard of South Korea (KS X 3262).

Specification 

The overall structure of the hash function LSH is shown in the following figure.

The hash function LSH has the wide-pipe Merkle-Damgård structure with one-zeros padding.
The message hashing process of LSH consists of the following three stages.

 Initialization:
 One-zeros padding of a given bit string message.
 Conversion to 32-word array message blocks from the padded bit string message.
 Initialization of a chaining variable with the initialization vector.
 Compression:
 Updating of chaining variables by iteration of a compression function with message blocks.
 Finalization:
 Generation of an -bit hash value from the final chaining variable.

The specifications of the hash function LSH are as follows.

Initialization

Let  be a given bit string message.

Then  is considered as a -byte array , where  for all .
The -byte array  converts into a -word array  as follows.

 

From the word array , we define the  32-word array message blocks  as follows.

 

The 16-word array chaining variable  is initialized to the initialization vector .

 

The initialization vector  is as follows.
In the following tables, all values are expressed in hexadecimal form.

Compression

In this stage, the  32-word array message blocks , which are generated from a message  in the initialization stage, are compressed by iteration of compression functions.
The compression function  has two inputs; the -th 16-word chaining variable  and the -th 32-word message block .
And it returns the -th 16-word chaining variable .

The following four functions are used in a compression function:

 Message expansion function 
 Message addition function 
 Mix function 
 Word-permutation function 

The overall structure of the compression function is shown in the following figure.

In a compression function, the message expansion function  generates  16-word array sub-messages  from given .
Let  be a temporary 16-word array set to the -th chaining variable .
The -th step function  having two inputs  and  updates , i.e., .
All step functions are proceeded in order .
The process of a compression function in detail is as follows.

Here the -th step function  is as follows.

 

The following figure shows the -th step function  of a compression function.

Message Expansion Function MsgExp

Let  be the -th 32-word array message block.
The message expansion function  generates  16-word array sub-messages  from a message block .

 
 

The next sub-messages  are generated as follows.

  

Here  is the permutation over  defined as follows.

Message Addition Function MsgAdd

Mix Function Mix

For , the mix function  proceeds as follows.

 

Here  is a two-word mix function.
Let  and  be words.
The two-word mix function  is defined as follows.

The two-word mix function  is shown in the following figure.

The initial 8-word array constant  is defined in the following table.

Word-Permutation Function WordPerm

Let  be a 16-word array.
The word-permutation function  is defined as follows.

Here  is the permutation over  defined by the following table.

Finalization

The finalization function  returns -bit hash value  from the final chaining variable .

  
  
 

Security 

LSH is secure against known attacks on hash functions up to now.
LSH-256 is secure against all the existing hash function attacks when the number of steps is 13 or more, while LSH-512 is secure if the number of steps is 14 or more.
Note that the steps which work as security margin are 50% of the compression function.

Performance 

LSH outperforms SHA-2/3 on various software platforms.
The following table shows the speed performance of 1MB message hashing of LSH on several platforms.

The following table is the comparison at the platform based on Haswell, LSH is measured on Intel Core i7-4770k @ 3.5 GHz quad core platform, and others are measured on Intel Core i5-4570S @ 2.9 GHz quad core platform.

The following table is measured on Samsung Exynos 5250 ARM Cortex-A15 @ 1.7 GHz dual core platform.

Test vectors 

Test vectors for LSH for each digest length are as follows.
All values are expressed in hexadecimal form.

LSH-256-224("abc") = F7 C5 3B A4 03 4E 70 8E 74 FB A4 2E 55 99 7C A5 12 6B B7 62 36 88 F8 53 42 F7 37 32

LSH-256-256("abc") = 5F BF 36 5D AE A5 44 6A 70 53 C5 2B 57 40 4D 77 A0 7A 5F 48 A1 F7 C1 96 3A 08 98 BA 1B 71 47 41

LSH-512-224("abc") = D1 68 32 34 51 3E C5 69 83 94 57 1E AD 12 8A 8C D5 37 3E 97 66 1B A2 0D CF 89 E4 89

LSH-512-256("abc") = CD 89 23 10 53 26 02 33 2B 61 3F 1E C1 1A 69 62 FC A6 1E A0 9E CF FC D4 BC F7 58 58 D8 02 ED EC

LSH-512-384("abc") = 5F 34 4E FA A0 E4 3C CD 2E 5E 19 4D 60 39 79 4B 4F B4 31 F1 0F B4 B6 5F D4 5E 9D A4 EC DE 0F 27 B6 6E 8D BD FA 47 25 2E 0D 0B 74 1B FD 91 F9 FE

LSH-512-512("abc") = A3 D9 3C FE 60 DC 1A AC DD 3B D4 BE F0 A6 98 53 81 A3 96 C7 D4 9D 9F D1 77 79 56 97 C3 53 52 08 B5 C5 72 24 BE F2 10 84 D4 20 83 E9 5A 4B D8 EB 33 E8 69 81 2B 65 03 1C 42 88 19 A1 E7 CE 59 6D

Implementations 

LSH is free for any use public or private, commercial or non-commercial.
The source code for distribution of LSH implemented in C, Java, and Python can be downloaded from KISA's cryptography use activation webpage.

KCMVP 

LSH is one of the cryptographic algorithms approved by the Korean Cryptographic Module Validation Program (KCMVP).

Standardization 

LSH is included in the following standard.

 KS X 3262, Hash function LSH (in Korean)

References 

Cryptographic hash functions
Cryptographic algorithms